John of Hildesheim, O.Carm. (born in 1310/1320, Hildesheim, and died in 1375, Marienau) was a writer and Carmelite friar from the German town of Hildesheim, then the capital of the Prince-Bishopric of Hildesheim, an independent state within the Holy Roman Empire. Due to his status as a friar, he was able to travel through Germany, France and Italy, and his broad literary opus includes works of philosophy, theology and poetry.

John is chiefly known as the author of the popular Historia Trium Regum (History of the Three Kings), which records the history of the Three Magi, derived from the Biblical story, including their background before their journey to Bethlehem trailing the famous Star, their lives after the Adoration, and the history of their relics (reputed to lie in the Shrine of the Three Kings at Cologne Cathedral in Cologne, Germany). Also included is a lengthy account of the Magi's descendant, the fabled priest-king Prester John of medieval legend. The work was attributed to John of Hildesheim by later commentators like Johannes Trithemius, but not all modern historians take this for granted.

Others of John's works include The Mirror of the Source of Life, a treatise on the nature of life, and writings in defense of the Carmelite Order.

External links
 The Mirror of the Source of Life from the-orb.net.
 The Three Kings of Cologne adapted from Historia Trium Regum.
 Carl Horstmann, The Three Kings of Cologne: An Early English Translation of the "Historia trium regum" by John of Hildesheim. Edited from the Mss., together with the Latin Text (London: Trübner & Co., 1886 [= Early English Text Society, Original Series, nr. 85]) online link.
 Three Kings of Cologne - An early English translation of the Historia Trium Regum by C. Horstmann, 1886 (omits the Latin text).

References
Rudolph Hendriks (ed.), “A Register of the Letters and Papers of John of Hildesheim, O.Carm.” Carmelus 4 (1957): 116–235.

14th-century births
1375 deaths
People from Hildesheim
14th-century Latin writers
Carmelites
14th-century German Roman Catholic priests
14th-century German historians
German male non-fiction writers